(English: This place), is a sacred motet composed by Paul Mealor in 2011. The text is the Latin gradual Locus iste for the annual celebration of a church's dedication. Mealor set it for four unaccompanied voices, at times divided, for the 500th anniversary of the King's College Chapel in Aberdeen in 2009.

History 
The Welsh composer Paul Mealor, professor of composition at the University of Aberdeen from 2003, composed  for the 500th anniversary of the King's College Chapel in 2009.

Text and music 
The Latin text of Locus iste is the gradual , part of the proper of the mass for the anniversary of a church's dedication. The incipit, translates to "This place was made by God".

The motet is scored for an unaccompanied choir which is at times divided. 

{|
|
|style="padding-left:2em;"|This place was made by God,
a priceless sacrament;
it is without reproach.
|}

The duration is given as 6:29 minutes.

Locus iste was recorded by Tenebrae as part of a collection, A Tender Light, of choral music by Mealor in 2011. It was recorded by the Choir of King's College, Aberdeen, in 2016 as part of the collection O Sacrum Convivium of contemporary sacred music.

References

External links 
 A Tender Light Discogs
 Uren, Adam: Celebrated composer Paul Mealor to attend performance of his works in Twin Cities bringmethenews.com 18 April 2022
 

2009 compositions
Motets